The Kinzelyuk Waterfall is probably the highest waterfall in Russia, after the elusive Talnikovy Waterfall (which may not exist any more). In 1989, a team led by Petro Kravchuk estimated its height to be 328 meters.

The waterfall is located in the eastern part of the Kuraginsky District, near the border with the Irkutsk Oblast, in the sparsely populated region of Siberia known as Tofalaria.

The stream flows out of the Lake Kinzelyuk, which occupies the summit of the Kinzelyuk Mountain, with a height of 1601 meters. The water falls into the small Lower Kinzelyuk Lake, which feeds the Kinzelyuk River, a tributary of the Kizir River.

The Kinzelyuk Mountain is part of the Kinzelyuk Ridge, the westernmost spur of the Agulski Belki mountains. The entire mountainous region is known as the Eastern Sayan Mountains.

References 

Landforms of Krasnoyarsk Krai
Waterfalls of Russia